NH 4A may refer to:

 National Highway 4A (India)
 New Hampshire Route 4A, United States